The 1944–45 Copa Federación de España was the first staging (old competition) of the Copa Federación de España, a knockout competition for Spanish football clubs.

The competition began on 18 February 1945 and ended with the final on 21 May 1945, where San Martín became champion after defeating Valladolid.

Competition

First round

|}

Second round

|}

Fourth round

|}

Fifth round

|}

Sixth Round

|}

Semi-finals

|}

Final

Copa Federación de España seasons
Fed